Mattias Lindström (born March 21, 1991) is a Swedish ice hockey player. He is currently playing with Clemensnäs HC of the Division 2. Lindstrom was drafted 88th overall in the 2009 NHL Entry Draft by the Carolina Hurricanes.

Playing career
In 2009-10, Lindström only played one game with Skellefteå's junior team as he suffered a knee injury during team practice. The injury was so serious that it required surgery and forced him to focus on rehabilitation for the rest of the season.

On January 18, 2012, Lindström was traded by the Hurricanes to the Florida Panthers, along with Jonathan Matsumoto, in exchange for Evgenii Dadonov and A.J. Jenks.

Lindström made his North American debut the following season, playing with the Panthers' secondary affiliate, the Cincinnati Cyclones of the ECHL for the duration of the 2012-13 ECHL season. In the final year of his NHL contract with the Panthers, his season was wiped out as he was unable to play with a hip injury.

On July 10, 2014, Lindström returned as a free agent to Sweden, signing a one-year deal with the ambition to re-establish his professional career with Piteå HC of the Hockeyettan.

Career statistics

Regular season and playoffs

International

References

External links

1991 births
Living people
Carolina Hurricanes draft picks
Cincinnati Cyclones (ECHL) players
Piteå HC players
Skellefteå AIK players
Swedish ice hockey left wingers
Tingsryds AIF players
People from Luleå
Sportspeople from Norrbotten County